Jan Berdyszak (15 June 1934 –18 September 2014) was a Polish artist. From 1952 to 1958, he studied at the Sculpture Department of the State College of Fine Arts in Poznań (now Fine Arts Academy), where he eventually returned as a lecturer. He participated in numerous exhibitions both in Poland and abroad. His works were exhibited in the Foto-Medium-Art Gallery in 1980, 1986, 1995 and 2007. 

In honor  of his merits for culture he was appointed a Knight of Polonia Restituta Order in 1988 and an Officer of Polonia Restituta in 2001. He also received the Doctorate Honoris Causa of Fine Arts Academy in Bratislava in 1999.

Projects
Berdyszak's artistic projects cover a wide range of fields and techniques, including graphic design, sculpture, installations, photography, and stage designs for theatre performances. His art is frequently analytical and academic, and he frequently deliberates on variations of a particular problem, sometimes bringing threads from past projects into subsequent ones.

A number of Berdyszak's works concentrate on the issue of space, which he defined as "the original being, and also density, darkness, void, transparency and potentiality." He later focused on notions of sacrum, space-time continuum and infinity. His sculpture projects and stage designs frequently reflect on light, words, and movement.

Works
The artist's works have been purchased by museums and private collections including the National Museums in Warsaw, Cracow, Wrocław; Art Museum in Łódź, Staatliches Museum in Berlin, UNESCO Collection in Paris, The Kosciuszko Foundation in New York, Boston Museum of Fine Art and the Pushkin Museum in Moscow.

List of selected works
 Double Circles, 1962–64
 Compositions of Circles, 1963
 Structural Painting with an OpeningIII, 1965
 Animated Art, 1966–1970
 Transparent, 1970–1979
 Frames of the East, 1972
 Silence, 1972–1975
 Reserved Seats, 1973–1976
 Infinity, 1975–1977
 Beams of the Cross, 1977–1988
 Fragments as Radical Wholes, 1982–1984
 Others to Bases, 1982–1984
 States of Morality, 1985–1987
 At the Stone, 1986–1988
 Neither Necessity Nor Possibility, 1987–1995
 Beams, 1988–2001
 Passe-pas-tout, 1990-2000
 Apres Passe-par-tout, 2000
 Photographic Re-Installations, 1992-?
 Covers and Aftercovers, 1995-?

Photo gallery

Bibliography
Now! Artists of Foto-Medium-Art Gallery, Mazowieckie Centrum Sztuki Współczesnej „Elektrownia” w Radomiu, Radom 2008.

References

External links
 Profile of Jan Berdyszak at Culture.pl
 Jan Berdyszak - biography and graphics of the artist: Galeria Muzalewska

1934 births
2014 deaths
Academic staff of the University of Fine Arts in Poznań